The 2018 Football Federation Tasmania season was the fifth season of association football under the restructured format in Tasmania. The men's competitions consisted of three major divisions across the State of Tasmania. The overall premier qualified for the National Premier Leagues finals series, competing with the other state federation champions in a final knock-out tournament to decide the National Premier Leagues Champion for 2018.

Men's Competitions

2018 NPL Tasmania

The 2018 NPL Tasmania season was played as a triple round-robin over 21 rounds.

2018 Tasmanian Championships

2018 Northern Championship

The 2018 Northern Championship was the fifth edition of the Northern Championship as the second level domestic association football competition in Tasmania. The league consisted of 9 teams, playing 16 matches each over 18 rounds, followed by 3 rounds for the top eight teams, split into the top four, followed by the next four teams.

Riverside Olympic as Champions were promoted to the 2019 NPL Tasmania under a new promotion and relegation structure.

2018 Southern Championship

The 2018 Southern Championship was the fifth edition of the Southern Championship as the second level domestic association football competition in Tasmania. The league consisted of 9 teams, playing 16 matches each over 18 rounds.

Glenorchy Knights as Champions were promoted to the 2019 NPL Tasmania under a new promotion and relegation structure.

Women's Competitions

2018 Women's Super League

The 2018 Women's Super League season, known as the PFD Women's Super League for sponsorship reasons, was the third edition of the statewide Tasmanian women's association football league. The league was played as a triple round-robin over 21 rounds.

Promotion/relegation play-off

Cup Competitions

 

The Milan Lakoseljac Cup competition also served as the Tasmanian Preliminary Rounds for the 2018 FFA Cup. Devonport City entered at the Round of 32, and were eliminated in the Round of 16.

References

Football Federation Tasmania
Football Federation Tasmania seasons